Ahmad bin Abdullah Al Mahmoud is a Qatari diplomat and politician. In November 2017, he was elected as the head of the Consultative Assembly of Qatar. He was deputy prime minister and minister of state for cabinet affairs from September 2011 to November 2017.

Early life and education
He holds a bachelor's degree in Arabic and Islamic studies from Cairo University and a master's degree in economics from Central Michigan University.

Career
Mahmoud began his career in the ministry of foreign affairs and worked as third secretary. He served as the ambassador of Qatar to the United States and Oman, and as a nonresident ambassador to Mexico and Venezuela. He then was appointed minister of state for foreign affairs in 1995. During his tenure he was described as "de facto foreign minister of Qatar" by US diplomatic cables.

He was appointed deputy prime minister and minister of state for cabinet affairs in September 2011. He kept his portfolio in the cabinet reshuffle on 26 June 2013 and became deputy to Prime Minister Abdullah bin Nasser Al Thani. His tenure ended on 1 November 2017. Then he was named as the chairman of the Consultative Assembly of Qatar.

References

External links

Living people
Chairmen of Consultative Assembly of Qatar
Cairo University alumni
Central Michigan University alumni
Qatari diplomats
Ambassadors of Qatar to Mexico
Ambassadors of Qatar to the United States
Government ministers of Qatar
Year of birth missing (living people)